Castiglioncello Bandini is a village in Tuscany, central Italy, administratively a frazione of the comune of Cinigiano, province of Grosseto. At the time of the 2001 census its population amounted to 93.

Castiglioncello Bandini is about 50 km from Grosseto and 8 km from Cinigiano, and it is situated along the Provincial Road which links Monticello Amiata to Vallerona.

History 
Ruled by the Aldobrandeschi family in the Early Middle Ages, the castle of Castiglioncello was then held by the Piccolomini-Bandini.

Main sights 
 San Nicola (16th century), main parish church of the village, it was entirely re-built in the 16th century in place of an early church dating back to the Middle Ages.
 Chiesa del Madonnino (17th century), little church located near the castle, it was built in a Baroque style.
 Castiglion del Torto, old castle built by Aldobrandeschis in the 13th century, it was known also as Castiglioncello di Stribugliano for its proximity to the village of Stribugliano.

References

Bibliography 
 Aldo Mazzolai, Guida della Maremma. Percorsi tra arte e natura, Florence, Le Lettere, 1997.
 Giuseppe Guerrini, Torri e castelli della provincia di Grosseto, Siena, Nuova Immagine Editrice, 1999.

See also 
 Borgo Santa Rita
 Monticello Amiata
 Poggi del Sasso
 Porrona
 Sasso d'Ombrone

Frazioni of Cinigiano